Jennifer Walker Elrod (born Jennifer Leigh Walker; September 6, 1966) is a United States circuit judge of the United States Court of Appeals for the Fifth Circuit.

Background
Elrod was born in Port Arthur, Texas in 1966 and grew up in Baytown, Texas. She attended Baylor University and graduated magna cum laude with a Bachelor of Arts degree in economics in 1988. At Baylor, she was the Outstanding Graduating Senior of the Honors Program and was eventually named  Outstanding Young Alumna. She went to Harvard Law School in 1989 and received her Juris Doctor in 1992, graduating cum laude. At Harvard Law School, she was a member of the Board of Student Advisers, an active member of the Harvard Federalist Society, and a finalist in the Ames Moot Court competition. She became a member of the State Bar of Texas in 1992.

Elrod began her professional career by serving a two-year clerkship for federal district judge Sim Lake of the United States District Court for the Southern District of Texas. After completing her clerkship, she became an associate at the national law firm Baker Botts in 1994.

Judicial career

State judicial service 
In 2002, Governor Rick Perry appointed Elrod to be a judge on the 190th District Court in Harris County. She was elected to the judgeship in the 2002 general election, and again in 2006 when she ran unopposed. As a state district court judge, she presided over jury and bench trials involving civil litigation. Elrod remained on the Harris County bench until her confirmation to the Fifth Circuit.

In 2014, she upheld a Texan abortion law that required abortion doctors to get admitting privileges at a nearby hospital, thus forcing abortion facilities to comply with the expensive standards of hospital-style surgical centers. The law also banned abortions after 20 weeks of pregnancy and heavily restricted the use of abortion pills.

Federal judicial service 
President George W. Bush nominated Elrod to a vacancy on the Fifth Circuit on March 29, 2007, to replace Judge Patrick Higginbotham, who assumed senior status on August 26, 2006. Elrod received a hearing before the Senate Judiciary Committee on July 19, 2007, and was voted out of committee on September 20, 2007. She was confirmed by the United States Senate by voice vote on October 4, 2007. Elrod was the fourth judge nominated to the Fifth Circuit by Bush and confirmed by the Senate. She received her commission on October 19, 2007. She maintains chambers in Houston, Texas.

References

Sources

External links

Harris County District Courts Online
U.S. Department of Justice Resume for Elrod
White House Profile of Elrod
Lezon, Dale, "Senate confirms Harris County judge for appeals court," Houston Chronicle, October 5, 2007

1966 births
21st-century American judges
Baylor University alumni
Harvard Law School alumni
Judges of the United States Court of Appeals for the Fifth Circuit
Living people
Texas state court judges
United States court of appeals judges appointed by George W. Bush
Women in Texas politics
University of Houston faculty
21st-century American women judges
People associated with Baker Botts